Harold Goodwin (born November 14, 1973) is an American football coach who is the assistant head coach and run game coordinator for the Tampa Bay Buccaneers of the National Football League (NFL). He previously served as an assistant coach for the Arizona Cardinals, Indianapolis Colts, Pittsburgh Steelers and Chicago Bears.

Playing career
Goodwin played offensive line for the University of Michigan from 1992 to 1995. He was teammates on the offensive line with Doug Skene, Joe Cocozzo, Steve Everitt, Trezelle Jenkins, and Jon Runyan.

Coaching career

Early career
Goodwin began his coaching career as a graduate assistant at the University of Michigan from 1995 to 1997, where he worked with former teammates and future pros Steve Hutchinson, Jon Jansen, and Jeff Backus. In 1998, he moved to Eastern Michigan to serve as assistant offensive line coach, specifically overseeing tight ends and offensive tackles. This role expanded in 1999 to include the entire offensive line. At Eastern Michigan, Goodwin helped develop L. J. Shelton. Goodwin moved to Central Michigan in 2000 to assume the position of offensive line coach, and later assistant head coach.  Goodwin helped develop future NFL pros Eric Ghiaciuc and Adam Kieft in his time at Central Michigan.

Chicago Bears
In 2004, Goodwin was hired by the Chicago Bears as their assistant offensive line coach.

Pittsburgh Steelers
In 2007, Goodwin was hired by the Pittsburgh Steelers as their offensive line and offensive quality control coach. This involved a responsibility to help coach the offensive line and assist the offensive coaching staff with game preparation, video analysis and scouting of opponents.

Indianapolis Colts
On January 31, 2012, Goodwin was hired by the Indianapolis Colts as their offensive line coach under head coach Chuck Pagano.

Arizona Cardinals
On January 19, 2013, Goodwin was hired by the Arizona Cardinals as their offensive coordinator under head coach Bruce Arians.

Tampa Bay Buccaneers
On January 8, 2019, Goodwin was hired by the Tampa Bay Buccaneers as their assistant head coach and run-game coordinator, reuniting with head coach Bruce Arians. Goodwin earned his second Super Bowl title when the Buccaneers won Super Bowl LV.

Personal life
Goodwin graduated from the University of Michigan in 1996 with a degree in management and communications.  He and his wife, Monica, have three children. His younger brother Jonathan is a former Pro Bowl lineman who won a Super Bowl with the New Orleans Saints.

References

External links
Arizona Cardinals bio
Indianapolis Colts bio

1973 births
Living people
Sportspeople from Columbia, South Carolina
Players of American football from Columbia, South Carolina
Michigan Wolverines football players
Coaches of American football from South Carolina
Michigan Wolverines football coaches
Eastern Michigan Eagles football coaches
Central Michigan Chippewas football coaches
Chicago Bears coaches
Pittsburgh Steelers coaches
Indianapolis Colts coaches
Arizona Cardinals coaches
Tampa Bay Buccaneers coaches
National Football League offensive coordinators